Utricularia sect. Utricularia is a section in the genus Utricularia. The species in this section are suspended or affixed aquatic carnivorous plants.

See also
 List of Utricularia species

References

Utricularia
Plant sections